Shandong (Shan-tung, 山东, 山東) is a province of China.

Shandong or variation, may also refer to:

 Shandong cuisine, the cuisine found in Shandong Province

Places
 Shandong Peninsula (Jiaodong Peninsula), a peninsula in northeast China that separates the Bohai Sea from the Yellow Sea, creating the Bohai Strait 
 Shandong Subdistrict, Shapingba District, Chongqing province-level-city, Sichuan province, China

People
 Shandong people, the people and ethnicity of Shandong Province

 Tu Shandong (born 1961), Chinese engineer

Groups, companies, organizations
 Shandong Airlines (SDA), an airline based out of Shandong, China
 Shandong Television (SDTV), Jinan, Shandong, China
 Shandong Heavy Industry, Jinan, Shandong, China; a heavy equipment and automotive company
 Shandong (restaurant), Hollywood, Portland, Oregon, USA; a Chinese cuisine restaurant

Facilities and structures
 Shandong Provincial Stadium, Jinan, Shandong, China; an outdoor multi-sport stadium
 Shandong Arena, Jinan, Shandong, China; an indoor sports area
 Shandong Museum, Jinan, Shandong, China
 Shandong Art Museum, Jinan, Shandong, China

Military
 Battle of Shandong (1904), a naval battle in the Russo-Japanese War
 Chinese aircraft carrier Shandong
 Type 002 aircraft carrier, the Shandong-class aircraft carrier

Other uses
 Shandong maple (Acer truncatum), a deciduous tree found in northern China

See also

 Shandong East Circuit, a province of China during the Jin Dynasty
 Shandong clique, a warlord group during the early-20th-century Warlord era of China operating out of Shandong Province
 Shandong Sports Lottery (disambiguation)
 Shandong Stars (disambiguation)
 
 Shan Tung (disambiguation)
 Dongshan (disambiguation)
 Dong (disambiguation)
 Shan (disambiguation)